Cerynea thermesialis, the hot snout, is a species of moth in the family Erebidae first described by Francis Walker in 1866. It is found throughout subtropical Africa, from Sierra Leone to Madagascar; and from Kenya to South Africa.

References 

Boletobiinae
Moths of Africa
Moths of Madagascar
Moths described in 1866